Baron Lothar von Seebach (or Lothaire de Seebach; 26 March 1853 – 23 September 1930) was an Alsatian painter, designer, watercolorist and engraver.

Biography
He was born in Fessenbach, now part of Offenburg, and raised in Mannheim, where his father was a garrison officer. In 1875, after completing his studies at the Academy of Fine Arts, Karlsruhe under Ferdinand Keller, he rejoined his family in Strasbourg, where they had lived since the end of the Franco-Prussian War. Like many other painters before him, he set up his studio in the 14th Century Tour de l'Hôpital. Over the next twenty-five years, he made several study trips to England, Berlin and Paris, where he was influenced by the Fauvists. A fiercely independent man who led a simple life, he turned down offers of professorships in Karlsruhe and Strasbourg.

Seebach became a French citizen after World War I, but left Alsace in 1921 as the result of some professional conflicts. He lived briefly at Lake Constance and Frankfurt, then went back to Fessenbach to live with his brother. Ultimately, he returned to Strasbourg where he became renowned for his portrayals of the Old City and its inhabitants, and where he died in 1930.

Seebach was a member of the artistic community known as the "", named after a village in the commune of Bœrsch in the Bas-Rhin; a group that included  , Léon Hornecker, Anselme Laugel, Alfred Marzolff, Joseph Sattler, Émile Schneider, Léo Schnug and Charles Spindler. A street in Robertsau, a suburb to the north of Strasbourg, has been named for him.

Selected paintings

References

Further reading
Lothar von Seebach 1853-1930, B. et K. Offsetdruck, Ottersweier, 1996, 127 p.  (exhibition at Gengenbach in 1996)
 Hélène Braeuner (et al.), Les peintres et l'Alsace : autour de l'Impressionnisme, La Renaissance du Livre, Tournai, 2003, 190 p. 
 Nicolas Mengus, Lothar von Seebach, in Nouveau dictionnaire de biographie alsacienne, Fédération des sociétés d'histoire et d'archéologie d'Alsace, Strasbourg, 2000, vol. 35, p. 3611-3612
 Lothaire de Seebach, in Strasbourg 1900 : naissance d'une capitale (seminar, Musée d'art moderne et contemporain de Strasbourg, 1–4 December 1999), Somogy, Paris ; Musées de Strasbourg, 2000, p. 115 
 Gilles Pudlowski, Lothar von Seebach, in Dictionnaire amoureux de l'Alsace, Plon, Paris, 2010 p. 632-635 
 Brigitte Wilke, Les travaux et les jours : Lothar von Seebach, peintre de l'Alsace 1900, Nuée bleue, Strasbourg, 2003, 112 p.

External links

 Friends of Lothar von Seebach website (In German and French)
 ArtNet: More paintings by Seebach
 Lothar von Seebach (1853-1930, une vie, une œuvre. Redécouverte d'un artiste strasbourgeois  (brochure from the exhibition at the la Maison de la Région de Strasbourg in 2012)

1853 births
1930 deaths
People from Offenburg
People from the Grand Duchy of Baden
19th-century German painters
19th-century German male artists
German male painters
20th-century German painters
20th-century German male artists
Alsatian people